On 6 December 1999 during a conference in Papeete the Pacific Community, formerly the South Pacific Commission, adopted the present flag. The former flag featured on blue field a white ring, being the lower right part replaced by a chain of small gold stars. Above the stars was a small white palm tree. 

The current flag features a circle of stars (a star for each member of the organization), completed by an arch. The arch represents the secretariat which ties the countries together. Inside the circle figures an emblem consisting of sail, ocean and a palm tree. The sail and ocean symbolise linkage and interchange, while the sail itself represents a canoe and symbolises movement and change. The palm tree symbolises wealth. The colors intend to mirror the clear night skies of the Pacific (the dark blue field and the white stars). The turquoise sail, arch and lower wave symbolises youth and the island chains of the region.

External links
 SPC on World Statesmen
 SPC on Flags of the World

Pacific Community
Pacific Community
Pacific Community